Tarat is a village in the commune of Illizi, in Illizi Province, Algeria, located near the border with Libya beside a wadi beneath the eastern edge of the Tassili n'Ajjer mountain range.

See also
Tihoubar

References

Neighbouring towns and cities

Populated places in Illizi Province